Maitha Salem Al Shamsi is politician and government minister in the United Arab Emirates. She is the Minister of State. Forbes Middle East placed her 13th on a list of most powerful Arab women in the Middle East.

Biography
Maitha completed her Bachelor of Arts in 1980 from King Saud University in Saudi Arabia. She completed her master's degree in 1988 from Alexandria University in Egypt. Maitha has completed a post doctorate in Sociology. She wrote a number of books including the Expatriate Migration to the Gulf Cooperation Council States: Current Problems and Future Prospects, the Mother of the Nation: Fatima bint Mubarak, and Principles and Accomplishments. She served in the board of trustees of Abu Dhabi University. She sat on the UNESCO's Scientific Committee for the Arab States on Education and Scientific Research. In 2003 she was awarded the Sheikh Mohammed bin Rashid Al Maktoum Award for Arab Management. In 2008 she joined the Federal Government of the United Arab Emirates as the Minister of State. In 2008 she helped establish the Sorbonne University in Abu Dhabi. She was the chairperson of the Marriage Fund till February 2016. She is the chairperson of the Family Development Foundation. She is the Chairperson of the General Women's Union in United Arab Emirates. She is also the chair of Supreme Council for Motherhood and Childhood. She has criticised the atrocities committed against Rohingyas in Myanmar and has appreciated the work done by Bangladesh to support the Rohingya Refugees in Bangladesh. She also pledged to provide seven million dollars to support the Rohingya Refugees at an October 2017 United Nation conference in Geneva.

References

Year of birth missing (living people)
Living people
Women government ministers of the United Arab Emirates
Government ministers of the United Arab Emirates
United Arab Emirates University alumni